Fužine is a small settlement in the upper valley of the Poljane Sora River in the Municipality of Gorenja Vas–Poljane in the Upper Carniola region of Slovenia.

Since 1924 a small hydroelectric power plant has been operating on the river in the settlement.

References

External links 

Fužine on Geopedia

Populated places in the Municipality of Gorenja vas-Poljane